The Providencia Stakes is a Grade III American Thoroughbred horse race for three-year-old fillies over a distance of one and one-eighth miles on the turf course scheduled annually in April at Santa Anita Park. The event currently carries a purse of $100,000.

History
Inaugurated in 1981, it has been run at  miles for most of its existence.  It was run at 1 mile in 2004 and from 2006 to 2009.

In 2008, this race was upgraded from a Grade III to a Grade II, with its purse increased from $100,000 to $150,000.  It has been downgraded to a Grade III again although its purse remains the same.

Records
Speed  record:
 miles: 1:46.80 – Lady of Shamrock (2012)
1 mile:  1:34.20 –  	Acting Lady  (2009)

Margins:
 7 lengths -  	Artica  (1995)

Most wins by a jockey:
 4 – Laffit Pincay Jr. (1982, 1984, 1987, 1995)
 4 – Alex Solis (1994, 1999, 2002, 2005)
 4 – Kent J. Desormeaux (1996, 1994, 2004, 2016)
 4 – Mike E. Smith (2003, 2012, 2017, 2022)

Most wins by a trainer:
 4 – Gary F. Jones (1983, 1991, 1992, 1996)

Most wins by an owner:
 2 – William R. Hawn (1985, 1990)
 2 –  Mary Jones Bradley (1986, 1993)
 2 – Ellwood W. & Judy Johnston  (1987, 1994)
 2 – Jim Ford, Deron Pearson (2003, 2004)
 2 –  	Warren B. Williamson (2006, 2014)

Winners

Notes:

§ Ran as an entry

See also
List of American and Canadian Graded races

External links
 Santa Anita Media Guide for 2019 Winter Meet

References

1981 establishments in California
Horse races in California
Santa Anita Park
Flat horse races for three-year-old fillies
Turf races in the United States
Graded stakes races in the United States
Recurring events established in 1981
Grade 3 stakes races in the United States